Severi Sillanpää is a Finnish professional ice hockey forward who currently plays for JYP Jyväskylä of the SM-liiga.

References

External links

Living people
Ässät players
1988 births
Finnish ice hockey forwards
Sportspeople from Pori